François Duret (born 10 January 1911, date of death unknown) was a Swiss fencer. He competed in the individual épée event at the 1936 Summer Olympics.

References

External links
 

1911 births
Year of death missing
Swiss male épée fencers
Olympic fencers of Switzerland
Fencers at the 1936 Summer Olympics